National Olympic Committee of Solomon Islands (IOC code: SOL) is the National Olympic Committee representing Solomon Islands.

See also
Solomon Islands at the Olympics
Solomon Islands at the Commonwealth Games

References 

Solomon Islands